Barmak Akram, (born in 1966 in Kabul), is an Afghan filmmaker. Akram lives in Paris, where he studied fine arts. His first feature film, Kabuli Kid (2008), won several awards and has been shown at the Venice Film Festival. In 2013, he received the Best Screenplay award at the Sundance Film Festival for the film Wajma (An Afghan Love Story). He has also made experimental and documentary films, including Toutes Les Teles Du Monde (2009).

Filmography 

Kabuli Kid (2008)

Toutes Les Teles Du Monde (2009)

Wajma (An Afghan Love Story) (2013)

References

Living people
1966 births
Afghan film directors